Flaviaesturariibacter flavus is a Gram-negative and non-motile bacterium from the genus of Flaviaesturariibacter which has been isolated from soil from the Jeju Island in Korea.

References

Chitinophagia
Bacteria described in 2020